or  is a lake in the municipalities of Røyrvik and Lierne in Trøndelag county, Norway. It is the eighth-largest lake in the country.

The lake level is regulated by dams. The Røyrvikelva river flows into the north end of Limingen from the lake Vektaren, through a dam. The water flows out through a tunnel to Røyrvikfoss Power Station, at the village of Røyrvik. At the south end, near the village of Limingen in Lierne, the water flows out of the tunnel to the Tunnsjøen via the Tunnsjø Power Station, as well as to Linvasselv Power Station on the Swedish side.

References

Lakes of Trøndelag
Lierne
Røyrvik
Reservoirs in Norway